, provisionally known as 1999 TA10, is a near-Earth object (NEO) from the Amor asteroid group.  It is suspected of being an inner fragment of the differentiated asteroid 4 Vesta.

Given an absolute magnitude (H) of 17.9, and that the albedo is unknown, this NEO could vary from 500 to 1500 meters in diameter.

 was discovered by LINEAR at Lincoln Laboratory ETS on 5 October 1999 at apparent magnitude 17.7, when it was only 0.39 AU from Earth. In 2010, it came within 0.3 AU of Earth. During the 2010 close approach, NASA Infrared Telescope Facility (NASA IRTF) studies suggested that  originated from the interior of Vesta. The next close approach will be in 2023. In 2086, it will come within  of Mars.

See also 
 Vestoid
 V-type asteroid

References

External links 
 
 
 

237442
237442
19991005